Hofheim in Unterfranken ) is a city located in the district of Haßberge, Unterfranken, Bavaria in Germany.

The municipality consists of the town of Hofheim and the villages of Eichelsdorf, Erlsdorf, Goßmannsdorf, Lendershausen, Manau, Ostheim, Reckertshausen, Rügheim and Sulzbach.

Between 1892 and 1995 it also had a branch line to Haßfurt.

Major trades are farming, gardening, fruit-growing, and small industry like metal- and textile-processing and brewing.

References

Haßberge (district)